The five-cent coin was first issued as a silver coin of .800 fineness in 1866. It had a diameter of 15 mm, thickness of 0.80 mm, weighed 1.34 grams, and had a reeded edge. This coin was minted in silver until 1935, when its composition was changed to copper-nickel. It had an extensive mintage between 1866 and 1933, with some issued in 1932–33 with a plain edge. The coin was not minted in 1869–71, 1878, 1896, and 1906–1932. The following copper-nickel denomination was identical in all aspects except the composition and weight: it weighed 1.36 grams, 0.02 grams heavier than the previous coin. This was a one-year type as it was replaced with a pure nickel coin in 1937. This time, it had a diameter of 16.51 mm, was 1.73 mm thick, and weighed 2.59 grams. This was minted until 1941, with the last issue being scarce.  Unlike the very rare 1941 Hong Kong one-cent coin these are available, although were never released to circulation because of the Japanese occupation.

For a period of eight years the denomination was replaced by banknotes and the Japanese military yen. When reintroduced in 1949, it had the same specifications as the last issue, but was minted in nickel-brass. Until 1970 the issue had a reeded security edge; afterwards, it was only reeded. This coin was issued in 1949–50, 1958, 1960, 1963–65, 1967, 1971–72, and 1977–80, with a non-circulating coin issued in 1988. The 1964H issue is scarce.  On 1 January 1989, the coin ceased to be used as currency.

Mintage
Mintmarks
 H = Heaton
 KN = King's Norton

References

 Ma Tak Wo 2004, Illustrated Catalogue of Hong Kong Currency, Ma Tak Wo Numismatic Co., LTD Kowloon Hong Kong. 

Coins of Hong Kong
Five-cent coins